Bareilly Airport  is a domestic airport serving Bareilly, Uttar Pradesh, India at Indian Air Force's Trishul Air Base in Izzatnagar, located  north from the city centre.

Terminal 1

Bareilly Airport was inaugurated by state civil aviation minister Nand Gopal Nandi and Union minister Santosh Gangwar on 10 March 2019 at the civil enclave of Trishul Air Base.

The terminal building is 2500 square meters, and can handle 150 passengers (75 arrival, 75 departure) during the peak hour. Its new apron measuring 95×100 metres provides parking space for two ATR aircraft at a time as per IMG norms, and has a car park for 150 cars..

Terminal 2

A new terminal building was inaugurated on 8 March 2021 as part of the airport expansion project. The building is spread over 3,020 square metres and has a capacity to accommodate over 300 passengers. It has two baggage conveyor belts and six check-in counters. It has an apron for parking of ATR 72-600 type of aircraft. The total cost of these works is expected to be around Rs. 70 crore.

Trishul Air Base Bareilly

Trishul Air Base, one of the Indian Air Force's largest, is a part of the Central Air Command. The base has a squadron of Sukhoi Su-30MKI fighters and a helicopter squadron of HAL Dhruv. Its underground hangar is considered one of Asia's largest.

Civil enclave 
The Airports Authority of India approved construction of a passenger terminal at the Bareilly civil enclave. The district administration bought  of land from local farmers for the project. The AAI began the tender process to award construction contracts for the airport in September 2017 and expected the civil enclave to be ready by March 2018, pending Uttar Pradesh government approval. However, the IAF requested changes in the layout of the taxiway connecting the terminal to the runway. After the Ministry of Defence approved the taxiway, passenger service was hoped to begin by February 2019. The job of developing the civil enclave was awarded to M/s SCC Infrastructure Pvt.Ltd. a construction company based at Ahemdabad Gujarat and the turn key engineering and design of the proposed structures was entrusted to M/s Solcon Consultants a design and engineering firm based at Vadodara, Gujarat.

Airlines and destinations

See also 
Lal Bahadur Shastri Airport
Chaudhary Charan Singh Airport
Kanpur Airport
Kushinagar International Airport
Airports in India
List of the busiest airports in India

References

External links 

Indian Air Force bases
Airports in Uttar Pradesh
Transport in Bareilly
Buildings and structures in Bareilly